Laura Strati (born 3 October 1990) is an Italian long jumper.

Biography
She finished 9th at the 2017 European Athletics Indoor Championships and has won seven times at the Italian Athletics Championships. she has 10 caps in senior national team from 2015. She lives in Madrid from 2017 where she works as interpreter.

Personal best
Long jump: 6.72,   Avila, 15 July 2017

Progression

Outdoor

Indoor

Achievements

National titles
She won seven national championships.
3 wins in the long jump outdoor (2016, 2017, 2018)
4 wins in the long jump indoor (2011, 2012, 2017, 2020)

See also
 Italian all-time lists - Long jump

References

External links
 

1990 births
Living people
Italian female long jumpers
People from Bassano del Grappa
World Athletics Championships athletes for Italy
European Games competitors for Italy
Athletes (track and field) at the 2019 European Games
Athletes (track and field) at the 2018 Mediterranean Games
Mediterranean Games competitors for Italy
Sportspeople from the Province of Vicenza
20th-century Italian women
21st-century Italian women